José Manuel Cervino (born 29 October 1940) is a Spanish film and television actor. He won the Goya Award for Best Supporting Actor in 2007 and was nominated for the Goya Award for Best Actor in 1987.

Life and career

José Manuel Cervino Almeida was born in Arona, on the island of Tenerife (Canary Islands), in 1940.

Despite his left-wing political beliefs and reputation for kindness, he often played right-wing villains for director Eloy de la Iglesia. He generally worked in films that explored themes of marginalization, juvenile delinquency, and drug abuse. He won the Goya Award for Best Supporting Actor for his role in 13 Roses.

He appeared in the 2008 television series Men Hunters, which garnered good critical reviews, prompting Antena 3 to keep it on the air despite low viewership until the end of its first and only season. In 2009 he was a member of the jury at the 12th Malaga Film Festival.

In 2013 he appeared in the daily television series Gran Reserva: El Origen, which explored the background of series Gran Reserva, focusing on the lives of two winery families (Cortázar and Reverte) in the 1960s.

Filmography

Featute films

Short films

Television

References

External links 
 
 An idiot is someone who can't stand a success , report in  El País  (02/16/2008) 
 / Tes / Report in  El País , by Rosana Torres (07/28/1986) 
 

1940 births
Spanish film actors
Spanish television actors
Living people
20th-century Spanish male actors
21st-century Spanish male actors